Arie Romijn (born 4 December 1958 in Gorinchem) is a former Dutch professional footballer and coach of amateur squads. His position was forward. After professional football, he founded a trading company.

Football career 
Romijn played in the youth of SVW Gorinchem, where his father was a forward before him. He also played one year in GVV Unitas, went back and made it into SVW's first squad at the age of 15. He was then scouted by Feyenoord.

In 1978 Romijn made his debut in Feyenoord's first squad and continued the season on loan in FC Groningen. He transferred to FC Den Bosch, for which, during three years, he was the club's top scorer. Next came SBV Vitesse, a second run at FC Den Bosch, and RBC Roosendaal. Before RBC and after his professional career, Romijn played for SVW Gorinchem, GVV Unitas, and finally in GJS Gorinchem until 2014 (by then already in the 5th squad).

Romijn managed DVV Fluks (1988–1990), VV Sliedrecht (1990–1993), SVW Gorinchem (1993–1994), VV Papendrecht (1994–1997), ASWH (1997–1998), and GJS Gorinchem (1998–1999).

References

External links 
Business website

Dutch footballers
Dutch football managers
ASWH managers
Feyenoord players
FC Groningen players
FC Den Bosch players
RBC Roosendaal players
SBV Vitesse players
Footballers from Gorinchem
Businesspeople from Gorinchem
1958 births
Living people
Association football forwards